James Montgomery Boice (July 7, 1938 – June 15, 2000) was an American  Reformed Christian theologian, Bible teacher, author, and speaker known for his writing on the authority of Scripture and the defence of Biblical inerrancy.  He was also the Senior Minister of Tenth Presbyterian Church in Philadelphia from 1968 until his death.

He can be heard on The Bible Study Hour radio broadcast and many of his writings are publicly available in print and online.  He also served as Chairman of the International Council on Biblical Inerrancy for over ten years and was a founding member of the Alliance of Confessing Evangelicals.

Biography
James Montgomery Boice was a Bible teacher, author, and articulate spokesman in the United States and around the world on the topics of Scriptural authority and inerrancy.  He was also the pastor of Philadelphia's historic Tenth Presbyterian Church from 1968 to 2000.

Under Boice's leadership and teaching of Christian beliefs, Tenth Presbyterian Church became a model for ministry in America's northeastern inner cities, offering a range of classes, fellowship groups, and specialised outreach ministries to the physically sick, women in crisis, and the homeless. In 1983, he founded City Center Academy (now The City School), a college-preparatory Christian school primarily serving minority residents of the church's neighborhood.

Boice was active in many initiatives beyond his own organization. He served as Chairman of the International Council on Biblical Inerrancy (ICBI) from its founding in 1977 until the completion of its work in 1988. ICBI produced three classic, creedal documents, published books, conducted "Authority of Scripture" seminars, and sponsored the large lay "Congress on the Bible I," which met in Washington, D.C., in September 1987. He also served on the Board of Bible Study Fellowship.  He helped develop the Alliance of Confessing Evangelicals, being "formed in 1994 out of what was known as Evangelical Ministries when James Boice, then senior pastor of Tenth Presbyterian Church in Philadelphia and teacher on The Bible Study Hour radio program, called together a group of like-minded pastors and theologians from a variety of denominations to unite in a common cause to help revive a passion "for the truth of the Gospel" within the church."

Over his lifetime Boice was a prodigious world traveler, having journeyed to more than thirty countries and teaching from the Bible in England, France, Switzerland, Canada, Japan, Australia, Guatemala, Korea and Saudi Arabia. While pursuing his doctoral studies in Switzerland, he started a Bible study group that eventually developed into the Basel Christian Fellowship.

Boice received a diploma from The Stony Brook School (1956), an A.B. from Harvard University (1960), a B.D. from Princeton Theological Seminary (1963), a Th.D from the University of Basel in Switzerland (1966), and a D.D., (honorary) from the Theological Seminary of the Reformed Episcopal Church (1982).

He died of liver cancer on June 15, 2000.  He was married to Linda Ann Boice (born McNamara)

Writings
Boice was a prolific author, having published over 50 different works, including a collection of hymns. Some of his popular books include:

 Foundations of the Christian Faith
 The Doctrines of Grace: Rediscovering the Essentials of Evangelicalism
 Christ's Call to Discipleship
 Renewing Your Mind in a Mindless World: Learning to Think and Act Biblically
 Parables of Jesus
 What Ever Happened to the Gospel of Grace?
 Dealing With Bible Problems: Alleged Errors and Contradictions in the Bible
 Ordinary Men Called by God: A Study of Abraham, Moses, and David

Expositional commentaries
Boice also published many volumes of commentaries on books of the Bible, which each were edited from his spoken teachings:

 Joshua
 Nehemiah
 Daniel
 The Minor Prophets (2 volumes;)
 Gospel of Matthew (2 volumes;)
 The Sermon on the Mount
 Acts
 Ephesians
 Philippians
 The Epistles of John

Boice is also known for contributing his commentary of the Epistle of Galatians to "The Expositor's Bible Commentary"

See also
Alliance of Confessing Evangelicals

References

External links
 Boice Center at Tenth Presbyterian Church
 The Bible Study Hour on OnePlace
 The Bible Study Hour
 

1938 births
2000 deaths
Presbyterians from Pennsylvania
United Presbyterian Church in the United States of America ministers
American Calvinist and Reformed theologians
The Stony Brook School alumni
Harvard University alumni
Princeton Theological Seminary alumni
Writers from Philadelphia
Bible commentators
20th-century Calvinist and Reformed theologians
20th-century American non-fiction writers
Presbyterian Church in America ministers
20th-century American clergy